Romania competed at the 2019 European Games, in Minsk, Belarus from 21 to 30 June 2019. Romania previously competed at the 2015 European Games in Baku, Azerbaijan, where it won 12 medals, including three golds.

Archery

Recurve

Badminton

References

Nations at the 2019 European Games
European Games
2019